In enzymology, a D-ribitol-5-phosphate cytidylyltransferase is an enzyme that catalyzes the chemical reaction

CTP + D-ribitol 5-phosphate  diphosphate + CDP-ribitol

Thus, the two substrates of this enzyme are CTP and D-ribitol 5-phosphate, whereas its two products are diphosphate and CDP-ribitol.

This enzyme belongs to the family of transferases, specifically those transferring phosphorus-containing nucleotide groups (nucleotidyltransferases).  The systematic name of this enzyme class is CTP:D-ribitol-5-phosphate cytidylyltransferase. Other names in common use include CDP ribitol pyrophosphorylase, cytidine diphosphate ribitol pyrophosphorylase, ribitol 5-phosphate cytidylyltransferase, and cytidine diphosphoribitol pyrophosphorylase.  This enzyme participates in pentose and glucuronate interconversions.

References 

 

EC 2.7.7
Enzymes of unknown structure